List of Guggenheim Fellowships awarded in 1961.
US and Canadian Fellows

 William Weaver Austin, Given Foundation Professor Emeritus of Musicology, Cornell University.
 Ben Haig Bagdikian, writer; Professor Emeritus of Journalism, University of California, Berkeley.
 Frederik Barry Bang, deceased. Medicine.
 Willis R. Barnstone, Professor of Comparative Literature, Indiana University.
 George A. Bartholomew, deceased. Professor Emeritus of Zoology, University of California, Los Angeles.
 Richard J. Bearman, Professor of Chemistry, University of New South Wales.
 John Frederick Bell, former medical director, Rocky Mountain Laboratory, U.S. Public Health Service.
 Harry J. Benda, deceased. Far Eastern History.
 Francis L. Berkeley, Jr., University Archivist Emeritus, University of Virginia.
 Ernst Berliner, W. Alton Jones Professor Emeritus of Chemistry, Bryn Mawr College.
 Wendell Erdman Berry, writer, Port Royal, Kentucky.
 David Duckworth Bien, Professor of History, University of Michigan.
 Ernst Bleuler, Professor Emeritus of Physics, Pennsylvania State University.
 Nicholas C. Bodman, deceased. Linguistics.
 John Lewis Bradley, Scholar, Somerset, England.
 Boris Bresler, deceased. Engineering.
 Robert Kenneth Brinton, deceased. Professor Emeritus of Chemistry, University of California.
 Peter de Beauvoir Brock, deceased. Professor Emeritus of History, University of Toronto.
 Jules Brody, Professor Emeritus of Romance Languages and Literatures, Harvard University1.
 Dana Charles Brooks, Professor of Anatomy, Cornell University Medical College.
 Robert Brout, Professor of Physics, Free University of Brussels. 
 Robert Brustein, artistic director of the American Repertory Theater
 Bernard Budiansky, deceased. Applied Mathematics.
 Sidney Alexander Burrell, Professor Emeritus of History.
 Herbert E. Carter, deceased. Professor Emeritus of Biochemistry, University of Arizona.
 William Andrew Chupka, Emeritus Professor of Chemistry, Yale University.
 Andrew Hill Clark, deceased. Geography.
 Eric William Cochrane Jr, Deceased. Italian History.
 Edward Colker, Provost and Professor of Art and Design, Pratt Institute.
 Arthur Dwight Culler, Emily Sanford Professor Emeritus of English Literature, Yale University: 1961, 1975.
 Alexander Dallin, deceased. Russian History.
 Ralph Thomas Daniel, deceased. Music Research.
 Bruce L. Davidson, Photographer, New York City.
 Margaret Gay Davies, deceased. British History.
 Angel del Río, deceased. Spanish.
 Arthur Deshaies, Graphic Artist, Duncan, South Carolina; Former professor of art, Florida State University.
 James Dickey, deceased. Poetry. 
 Edward Atkinson Dowey, Jr, Professor of the History of Christian Doctrine, Princeton Theological Seminary.
 Sidney David Drell, deceased. Emeritus Professor and deputy director, Stanford Linear Accelerator Center, Stanford University: 1961, 1971.
 Charles William Dunn, Margaret Brooks Robinson Professor Emeritus of Celtic Languages and Literatures, Harvard University.
 Francis Dvornik, deceased. Classics.
 Martin Dyck, Professor Emeritus of German and Literature, Massachusetts Institute of Technology.
 Richard S. Eckaus, Ford International Professor of Economics, Massachusetts Institute of Technology.
 Harold Edelman, deceased. Architecture & Design. 
 Halim El-Dabh, Egyptian-born composer (also awarded a Fellowship in 1959)
 George Paul Elliott, deceased. Fiction: 1961, 1970.
 Kenan Tevfik Erim, deceased. Classics.
 Jimmy Ernst, deceased. Fine Arts.
 Francis C. Evans, Retired Professor of Zoology, University of Michigan.
 Gertrude Falk, Lecturer in Biophysics, University College, University of London.
 Wen Fong, Edwards S. Sanford Professor of Art History, Princeton University.
 David C. Fowler, Professor Emeritus of English, University of Washington: 1961, 1975.
 Renée Claire Fox, Annenberg Professor Emerita of the Social Sciences, University of Pennsylvania.
 Gray Foy, Graphic Artist, New York City.
 Arnold Franchetti, deceased. Music Composition.
 Hans Pieter Roetert Frederikse, Retired Senior Scientist, National Institute of Standards and Technology.
 Julius H. Freitag, deceased. Biology.
 Ferdinand Freudenstein, Higgins Professor Emeritus of Mechanical Engineering, Columbia University: 1961, 1967.
 James John Fritz, Professor Emeritus of Chemistry, Pennsylvania State University.
 Donald C. Gallup, deceased. Bibliography: 1961, 1968.
 Raymond Dorner Giraud, Professor of French, Stanford University.
 Paul Wilbur Glad, Regents' Professor of History, University of Oklahoma.
 Donald Arthur Glaser, Nobel Laureate in Physics and Emeritus Professor of Physics, University of California, Berkeley.
 Edward Glaser, deceased. Spanish.
 Clarence Louis Frank Gohdes, deceased. American Literature.
 Sidney Goldstein, George Hazard Crooker University Professor Emeritus of Sociology, Brown University.
 Alfred M. Gollin deceased, Emeritus Professor of History, University of California, Santa Barbara: 1961, 1964, 1971.
 Malcolm S. Gordon, Professor of Biology, University of California, Los Angeles.
 Robert James Gorlin, Professor of Oral Pathology, School of Dentistry, and Professor of Obstetrics and Gynecology, School of Medicine, University of Minnesota.
 Charles Danne Graham, Jr., Emeritus Professor of Materials Science & Engineering, University of Pennsylvania. 
 William Roger Graham, deceased. British History.
 J. Glenn Gray, Deceased. Philosophy.
 Sarah Grilo, Argentinian painter.
 Erwin L. Hahn, Emeritus Professor of Physics, University of California, Berkeley: 1961, 1969.
 Benjamin D. Hall, Professor of Genetics, University of Washington.
 Ben Halpern, deceased. Richard Koret Professor of Near Eastern Studies, Brandeis University.
 Edward B. Ham, deceased. French.
 Robert W. Hansen, Professor Emeritus of Art, Occidental College.
 Curtis A. Harnack, Writer; executive director, Yaddo, Saratoga Springs, New York.
 Bernard G. Harvey, Senior Scientist Emeritus, Lawrence Berkeley Laboratory, University of California, Berkeley.
 Lawrence Elliot Harvey, deceased. French Language.
 Hugh Dodge Hawkins, Anson D. Morse Professor of History and American Studies, Amherst College: 1961.
 David Vincent Hayes, Sculptor, Coventry, Connecticut.
 Evans Vaughan Hayward, Retired Physicist, National Institute of Standards; Adjunct Professor Emeritus of Physics, Duke University.
 Eric Gustav Heinemann, Professor of Psychology, Brooklyn College, City University of New York.
 Leon A. Henkin, Professor Emeritus of Mathematics, University of California, Berkeley.
 David Herlihy, deceased. Medieval History.
 William Best Hesseltine, deceased. British History.
 Robert Maurice Hexter, deceased: Chemistry.
 Walter John Hipple, Jr., Emeritus Professor of Philosophy, West Chester State College.
 Jack Hirshleifer, Professor of Economics, University of California, Los Angeles.
 Herbert Hoffmann, Curator of Ancient Art, Museum Für Kunst und Gewerbe, Hamburg: 1961, 1972.
 Robert Goode Hogan, Playwright; Professor of English, University of Delaware.
 William Ransom Hogan, deceased. U.S. History.
 William Neil Holmes, Professor of Zoology, University of California, Santa Barbara.
 Louis Norberg Howard, Professor Emeritus of Mathematics, Massachusetts Institute of Technology; Professor Emeritus of Mathematics, Florida State University.
 Benjamin Hunningher, deceased. Theatre Arts.
 Nicolae Iliescu, Professor Emeritus of Romance Languages and Literature, Harvard University.
 Douglas Lamar Inman, Professor of Oceanography, Scripps Institution of Oceanography, University of California, San Diego.
 Kenneth Keith Innes, deceased. Chemistry.
 Charles Issawi, deceased, Bayard Dodge Professor Emeritus of Near Eastern Studies, Princeton University: 1961, 1968.
 Harry V. Jaffa, deceased, Salvatori Research Professor Emeritus of Political Philosophy, Claremont McKenna College, and Professor of Political Philosophy, Claremont Graduate School.
 Dorothy Jeakins, deceased. Theatre Arts.
 Sheldon Judson, deceased. Knox Taylor Professor of Geography, Emeritus Princeton University: 1961, 1966.
 Jerome Eugene Kaplan, deceased. Graphic Artist; Professor of Printmaking, Philadelphia College of Art.
 Robert Manoah Kark, Professor of Medicine, Rush Medical College; Professor Emeritus of Medicine, University of Illinois College of Medicine: 1961, 1974.
 Robert Kaske, deceased. Medieval Literature: 1961, 1977.
 John C. Keats, deceased. Fiction.
 Charles David Keeling, deceased,  Professor of Oceanography, Scripps Institution of Oceanography, University of California, San Diego.
 Donald Keene, University Professor Emeritus and Shincho Professor of Japanese Literature, Columbia University: 1961, 1971.
 Arthur Kent Kerman, Professor of Physics and Director, Center for Theoretical Physics, Massachusetts Institute of Technology.
 Anne D. Kilmer, chairman, Department of Near Eastern Studies, Professor of Assyriology, University of California, Berkeley: 1961, 1962.
 Jere Clemens King, deceased. French History.
 Otto Kinne, Professor of Biology and Director, Helgoland Institute of Biology, Hamburg.
 Kenneth Koch, deceased, Poet; Professor of English, Columbia University.
 Karl George Kohn, Composer; William M. Keck Distinguished Professor, Pomona College.
 Thor Kommedahl, Professor Emeritus of Plant Pathology, University of Minnesota.
 Wladyslaw W. Kulski, deceased. Political Science: 1961, 1969.
 Stephen Guild Kurtz, Retired Professor of History, American University, Washington, DC.
 David Sievert Lavender, Writer, Ojai, California: 1961, 1968.
 Hui-Lin Li, John Bartram Professor Emeritus of Botany, University of Pennsylvania.
 Robert B. Loftfield, Emeritus Professor of Biochemistry, University of New Mexico School of Medicine.
 Andrew Lossky, Professor Emeritus of History, University of California, Los Angeles.
 Francis E. Low, Institute Professor, Professor Emeritus of Physics, Massachusetts Institute of Technology.
 Thomas H. D. Mahoney, deceased. Professor Emeritus of History, Massachusetts Institute of Technology.
 Hans Albert Maier, deceased. German & Scandinavian Literature.
 Martin Edward Malia, Emeritus Professor of History, University of California; Berkeley.
 George Markow-Totevy, Professor of French, State University of New York College at Oswego.
 Paule Burke Marshall, Writer; Helen Gould Sheppard Professor of Literature and Culture, New York University. 
 Norman F. Martin, S.J., Professor Emeritus of History, University of Santa Clara.
 Leo Marx, Kenan Professor Emeritus of American Cultural History, Massachusetts Institute of Technology: 1961, 1965.
 Rufus Wellington Mathewson, Jr, deceased. Slavic Studies.
 Wallace I. Matson, Professor of Philosophy, University of California, Berkeley.
 John Seneca McGee, Professor Emeritus of Economics, University of Washington.
 Abraham Irving Melden, deceased. Philosophy.
 John Michael Montias, Professor Emeritus of Economics, Yale University.
 Relman Morin, deceased. Far Eastern History.
 Samuel Eliot Morison, deceased. U.S. History.
 Steven Alexander Moszkowski, Professor Emeritus of Physics, University of California, Los Angeles.
 William Wilson Mullins, deceased. Engineering.
 Lowry Nelson, Jr., deceased. 16th & 17th English Literature.
 Daniel U. Newman, Artist.
 Theodore S. Newman, Deceased. Music Composition.
 Albert Nijenhuis, Affiliate Professor, University of Washington, Seattle, WA; Professor Emeritus of Mathematics, University of Pennsylvania.
 Felix Johannes Oinas, Professor Emeritus of Slavic Languages and Literatures and of Uralic and Altaic Studies, Indiana University: 1961, 1966.
 David Okrent, Emeritus Professor of Engineering and Applied Science, University of California, Los Angeles: 1961, 1977.
 David Lockwood Olmsted, Professor of Anthropology, University of California, Davis.
 Robert Eugene Olson, Professor of Pediatrics, University of South Florida; Professor Emeritus of Medicine, School of Medicine, State University of New York at Stony Brook: 1961, 1970.
 Robert Ornstein, Oviatt Professor of English, Case Western Reserve University. 
 Harry Oster, American folklorist and musicologist who recorded traditional music from Louisiana.
 Neal Oxenhandler, Professor of Romance Languages and Comparative Literature, Dartmouth College.
 Sergio Pacifici, deceased. Italian Literature.
 Grace Paley, Writer; Retired Member of the Faculty, Sarah Lawrence College.
 Norman Dunbar Palmer, deceased. Political Science.
 William Eugene Parham, deceased. Chemistry.
 William Harwood Peden, deceased. Professor of English, University of Missouri-Columbia.
 Franklin Johnson Pegues, Professor of History, Ohio State University.
 Harold Brenner Pepinsky, Professor of Psychology and of Computer and Information Science, Ohio State University.
 David Dodd Perkins, John P. Marquand Professor of English Literature, Harvard University: 1961, 1972.
 William R. Polk, Scholar, Vance, France.
 Paul E. Potter, Professor Emeritus of Geology, University of Cincinnati.
 John Michael Prausnitz, Professor of Chemical Engineering, University of California, Berkeley: 1961, 1972.
 Sesto Prete, deceased, Professor of Latin, University of Kansas.
 Benton Seymour Rabinovitch, Professor Emeritus of Chemistry, University of Washington.
 Isaac Rabinowitz, deceased. Near Eastern Studies.
 Roy Radner, Leonard N. Stern School Professor of Business, New York University Stern School of Business: 1961, 1965.
 John Henry Raleigh, Professor of English, University of California, Berkeley.
 Charles Norwood Reilley, deceased. Chemistry.
 John W. Rhoden, deceased. fine Arts-Sculpture.
 Mordecai Richler, Writer, Montreal.
 Robert D. Richtmyer, Professor Emeritus of Mathematics, University of Colorado. 
 Michael Riffaterre, Franco-American literary scholar (also awarded a Fellowship in 1977)
 Kenneth Lloyd Rinehart, Jr., Professor of Chemistry, University of Illinois at Urbana-Champaign.
 Ronald Samuel Rivlin, Centennial University Professor Emeritus of Mathematics and Mechanics, Lehigh University.
 Helen Henley Robertson, deceased. Non-Fiction. Appointed as Helen Palmer Henley.
 Frank Sherwood Rowland, Donald Bren Research Professor of Chemistry, University of California, Irvine: 1961, 1973.
 Zevi W. Salsburg, Deceased. Chemistry.
 Stanley Salzman, Deceased. Architecture.
 James Alvin Sanders, President, Ancient Biblical Manuscript Center, Claremont, CA: 1961, 1972.
 Lawrence Ennis Savage, deceased. Medicine.
 Hans Juergen Eduard Schmitt, Professor, Institute for High-Frequency Engineering, Rhineland Westphalia Technical University, West Germany.
 Ira Oscar Scott, Jr, Retired President, Savings Bank Association of New York State, New York City.
 Paul Seabury, deceased. Political Science.
 Eduard Franz Sekler, Professor of Architecture, Osgood Hooker Professor of Visual Art, Harvard University: 1961, 1963.
 Raymond E. Shapiro, assistant director for Toxicology Coordination, National Institute of Environmental Health Sciences, Research Triangle Park, North Carolina.
 Charles H. Shattuck, deceased. 16th & 17th Century English Literature: 1961, 1968.
 Curtis Howard Shell, deceased. Fine Arts Research.
 Richard T. Shield, Professor of Theoretical and Applied Mechanics, University of Illinois at Urbana-Champaign.
 William Francis Shipley, Professor of Linguistics, University of California, Santa Cruz.
 Robert G. Shulman, Professor of Molecular Biophysics and Biochemistry, Yale University.
 Lawrence B. Slobodkin, Professor of Biology, State University of New York at Stony Brook: 1961, 1974.
 Paul Slud, Associate Curator, Division of Birds, Smithsonian Institution, Washington, D.C.
 Leo Frank Solt, deceased. Architecture.
 Joseph John Spengler, deceased. Economics.
 William Spindel, Principal Staff Office for Special Projects, National Academy of Sciences.
 George Robert Stange, Harriet H. Fay Professor Emeritus of English Literature, Tufts University.
 Harold Staras, deceased. Applied Mathematics.
 George Edwin Starbuck, deceased. Poetry.
 Charles Max Stein, Ray Lyman Wilbur Professor of Statistics, Stanford University.
 Leroy Carlton Stevens, Jr., Senior Staff Scientist, Jackson Laboratory, Bar Harbor, Maine.
 Jabez Curry Street, deceased. Physics.
 Paul Karl Stumpf, Professor Emeritus of Biochemistry, University of California, Davis: 1961, 1968.
 Thomas Tamotsu Sugihara, deceased. Chemistry.
 Richard Eugene Sullivan, Professor Emeritus of History and Dean, College of Arts and Letters, Michigan State University.
 Joseph Szövérffy, Scholar, Concord, Massachusetts: 1961, 1969.
 Paul Taylor, deceased, Choreographer, artistic director, The Paul Taylor Dance Company, New York City: 1961, 1966, 1983.
 William Tyrrell Thomson, Professor Emeritus of Mechanical Engineering, University of California, Santa Barbara.
 Charles Wyvil Todd, deceased. Biochemistry.
 Robert Ullman, deceased. Chemistry.
 Jaroslav Vanek, Carl Marks Professor Emeritus of Economics, Cornell University.
 Panayiotis J. Vatikiotis, deceased. Political Science
 Frank W. Wadsworth, Professor Emeritus of Literature and Vice Chairman of Development Committee, State University of New York College at Purchase.
 Erik Wahlgren, deceased. Medieval Literature.
 Lewis Glen Weathers, Professor of Plant Pathology, University of California, Riverside.
 Myron Weiner, deceased. Political Science.
 Lionel Edward Weiss, Professor Emeritus of Geology and Geophysics, University of California, Berkeley: 1961, 1969.
 Charles Allen West, Emeritus Professor of Biochemistry, University of California, Los Angeles.
 Henry Orson Wheeler, Emeritus Professor of Medicine, School of Medicine, University of California, San Diego.
 Cedric Hubbell Whitman, deceased. Classics: 1961, 1976.
 Kenneth Berle Wiberg, Eugene Higgins Professor of Chemistry, Yale University.
 Benjamin Widom, Goldwin Smith Professor of Chemistry, Cornell University: 1961, 1968.
 Herold Jacob Wiens, deceased. Geography.
 Harris Ward Wilson, deceased. 20th Century English Literature.
 Robert Rathbun Wilson, deceased. Physics.
 Howard Elliott Winn, deceased. Biology.
 Yvor Winters, deceased. Literary Criticism.
 Carl Leslie Withner, Professor Emeritus of Biology, Brooklyn College, City University of New York; Research Associate, Biology Dept., Western Washington University.
 Rudolf Jacob Wittkower, deceased. Architecture.
 Edwin Wolf, II, deceased. Bibliography.
 Andrew Wright, Professor of English Literature, University of California, San Diego: 1961, 1970.
 Harry Curtis Young, Jr, Professor of Botany and Plant Pathology, Oklahoma State University.

South American and Caribbean Fellows
 José Barros-Neto, Professor of Mathematics, Rutgers University: 1961, 1962.
 Hernán Caballero Delpino, Agricultural Research, Inter-American Institute for Cooperation on Agriculture, Quito, Ecuador.
 Emiliano Cabrera Juárez, Professor and Head of Biochemistry, National School of Biological Sciences, National Polytechnic Institute, Mexico City.
 Luis Camnitzer, Artist, Great Neck, New York: 1961, 1982.
 Adolfo Davidovich Guerberoff, Physiologist.
 Milan Jorge Dimitri, deceased. Biology-Plant Science.
 Alair de Oliveira Gomes, Physicist, Institute of Biophysics, Federal University of Rio de Janeiro.
 Sarah Grilo, Painter, Madrid: 1961, 1963.
 Felipe Landa Jocano, Professor of Asian Studies, University of the Philippines.
 Elon Lages Lima, Director, Institute of Pure and Applied Mathematics, Rio de Janeiro: 1961, 1963.
 David Manzur Londoño, Painter, Bogotá: 1961, 1962.
 Juan Carlos Merlo, deceased. Mathematics: 1961, 1962.
 Faustino Miranda G(onzález), deceased. Biology-Plant Science.
 Francisco Nemenzo, Professor Emeritus of Zoology, University of the Philippines; Consultant in Biology, Graduate School, University of San Carlos, Cebu City.
 Rafael Olivar-Bertrand, Professor Emeritus of Spanish, City College, City University of New York: 1961, 1963.
 Nelson Onuchic, Professor of Mathematics, University of São Paulo, Sao Carlos: 1961, 1962.
 Jacobo Rapaport Tirk, Distinguished Professor of Physics, Ohio University.
 Leonila Vázquez García, Research Biologist, Institute of Biology, National Autonomous University of Mexico.

References

Guggenheim Fellows for 1961

See also
Guggenheim Fellowship

1961
1961 awards